Martín Grandoli (c. 1765  c. 1830) was an Argentine politician, who served as regidor and alcalde of Buenos Aires. He had a preponderant political role during the colonial and post colonial period of Argentina.

He was born in Santa Fe the son of Pedro Pablo Grandoli and María Ximénez y Gaitán, belonging to a distinguished family from Malta and Buenos Aires Province. He was married twice, first with María Juana Pando, daughter of Bartolomé Pando and Bárbara Basualdo, and second to María Dionisia de Borja, daughter of Antonio Nazarre Velasco, born in Huesca, Spain, and Teresa Pérez de Asiain, born in Buenos Aires.

References

External links 
Sesiones de la Junta electoral de Buenos Aires (1815-1820)

1760s births
1830s deaths
People from Santa Fe Province
Mayors of Buenos Aires
Spanish colonial governors and administrators
Politicians from Buenos Aires